Sumiyoshi Shrine (住三吉神社, Sumiyoshi jinja) is a Shinto shrine located in Hakodate, Hokkaido. Its annual festival is on September 17. The kami Kamitsusu no O no Ōkami (上筒之男大神), Nakatsutsu no O no Ōkami (中筒之男大神), Sokotsutsu no O no Ōkami (底筒之男大神), Okinagaranushihime no Ōkami (息長足姫大神), Onamochi no Ōkami (大名持大神), Sukunabikona no Ōkami (少彦名大神) and others are enshrined here.

See also
List of Shinto shrines in Hokkaidō

External links
Hokkaido Shinto listing

Shinto shrines in Hokkaido

Beppyo shrines